The North American Computer Chess Championship was a computer chess championship held from 1970 to 1994. It was organised by the Association for Computing Machinery and by Monty Newborn, Professor of Computer Science at McGill University. It was one of the first computer chess tournaments. The 14th NACCC was also the World Computer Chess Championship.
The event was canceled in 1995 as Deep Blue was preparing for the first match against world chess champion Garry Kasparov, and never resumed.

References

External links
ACM COMPUTER CHESS by Bill Wall

Computer chess competitions
Recurring events established in 1970